Joszef “Josef” Grünfeld was a German association footballer who played as a centre forward in Germany, Austria and the United States.

In 1920–21, Grünfeld, brother of Bernhard Grünfeld, played for Hakoah Wien.  During the 1928-29 season, he played for Stuttgarter Kickers in the Bezirksliga Württemberg-Baden.  In 1929, he briefly played for Hakoah Wien in the Austrian Nationalliga before moving to the United States where he joined New York Hakoah in the Eastern Professional Soccer League for two games.  The EPSL ceased operation just after Grünfeld arrived and merged with the American Soccer League.  When that happened, New York Hakoah merged with Brooklyn Hakoah of the ASL to form the Hakoah All-Stars.

External links
 Grünfeld Jozsef, Kickers-Archiv (Kickers Stuttgart) (per 2019-12-10)
 Spielzeit 1918-1933: Josef Grünfeld

References

German footballers
Association football forwards
American Soccer League (1921–1933) players
Eastern Professional Soccer League (1928–29) players
SC Hakoah Wien footballers
Stuttgarter Kickers players
New York Hakoah players
Hakoah All-Stars players
German expatriate footballers
German expatriate sportspeople in the United States
Expatriate soccer players in the United States
Year of birth missing